Arkhom Chenglai (born June 11, 1970) is a Thai boxer. At the 1992 Summer Olympics he won a bronze medal in the men's Welterweight category.

Arkhom before being an amateur boxer was a Muay Thai fighter under the ring name Issara Sakgreerin (อิสระ ศักดิ์กรีรินทร์). He used to play football, one day, he hid from the rain at a Muay Thai gym and saw his brother training which led him to it.

He became a famous fighter, winning the Lumpinee Stadium Lightweight title, he fought with many famous fighters such as Nokweed Devy and earned purses going as high as 120,000 baht in the fight against Dutch fighter Ramon Dekkers at Lumpinee Stadium on November 11, 1990.

He fought in Muay Thai until no one was worthy of a bout against him. As a result, he switched to amateur boxing and won many awards highly recognized in the country. He then became a member of national team to compete in the 1992 Summer Olympics in Barcelona, Spain where he won a bronze medal.

He graduated from Wichienmatu School and earned a bachelor's degree from Chandrakasem Rajabhat College (currently Chandrakasem Rajabhat University).

After retirement, he opened a restaurant in his native Trang province.

Olympic results 
Defeated Yusef Khateri (Iran) 13-7
Defeated Nicodemus Odore (Kenya) 13-10
Defeated Vitalijus Karpaciauskas (Lithuania) 9-6
Lost to Michael Carruth (Ireland) 4-11

Muay Thai record

|-  style="background:#cfc;"
| 1991-07-01 || Win||align=left| Kiatdisak Nungmuengmaha ||  || Thailand || Decision || 5 || 3:00 
|-  bgcolor="#cfc"
| 1991-05-24 || Win ||align=left| Nokweed Devy || K-LEAGUE KENZAN|| Tokyo, Japan || Decision || 5 || 3:00
|-  bgcolor="#cfc"
| 1991-02-15 || Win ||align=left| Nokweed Devy || Muangchai Kittikasem vs Sot Chitalada||  Ayutthaya Province, Thailand || Decision || 5 || 3:00
|-  style="background:#cfc;"
| 1990-11-27 || Win||align=left| Ramon Dekkers || Lumpinee Stadium || Bangkok, Thailand || Decision (Unanimous) || 5 || 3:00 
|-
! style=background:white colspan=9 |
|-  style="background:#cfc;"
| 1990-08-18 || Win||align=left| Thantawanoi Tor.Silachai || Lumpinee Stadium || Bangkok, Thailand || Decision || 5 || 3:00 
|-
! style=background:white colspan=9 |
|-
| colspan=9 | Legend:

References

Sports Reference
ชีวิตใหม่ อาคม เฉ่งไล่ เปิดร้านอาหาร-เล่นหนังตะลุง 

1970 births
Living people
Arkhom Chenglai
Boxers at the 1992 Summer Olympics
Arkhom Chenglai
Place of birth missing (living people)
Olympic medalists in boxing
Asian Games medalists in boxing
Boxers at the 1994 Asian Games
Arkhom Chenglai
Medalists at the 1992 Summer Olympics
Arkhom Chenglai
Arkhom Chenglai
Medalists at the 1994 Asian Games
Lightweight kickboxers
Welterweight boxers
Arkhom Chenglai